Lõpemetsa is a village in Rapla Parish, Rapla County in northwestern Estonia. Between 1991–2017 (until the administrative reform of Estonian municipalities) the village was located in Raikküla Parish.

References

 

Villages in Rapla County